Henry Ernest Walkerden (20 November 1885 – 16 May 1966) was an Australian cricketer. He was a right-handed batsman. He played one first-class cricket match for Western Australia between 1909 and 1910, scoring 6 runs in 2 innings.

See also
 List of Western Australia first-class cricketers

References

External links
 

1885 births
Australian cricketers
Western Australia cricketers
Sportsmen from Western Australia
1966 deaths
People from Brunswick, Victoria
Cricketers from Melbourne